Equitable Building  was a , eight-story building at 30 Edgewood Avenue SE, in Atlanta, Georgia, United States.

History  
The Equitable Building was built for Joel Hurt, a prominent Atlanta developer and streetcar magnate. It was designed by Chicago's Burnham and Root, the firm established by Georgia-born architect John Wellborn Root (1850-1891) and his partner Daniel Hudson Burnham. When completed in 1892 it was the tallest building with the most floors in Atlanta outside the State Capitol until 1897. 

The building was demolished in 1971.

See also
List of tallest buildings in Atlanta
Equitable Building (Atlanta)

References

Office buildings completed in 1892
Buildings and structures demolished in 1971
Demolished buildings and structures in Atlanta
Office buildings in Atlanta
Burnham and Root buildings
Chicago school architecture in Georgia (U.S. state)